Peter Saunders  may refer to:
 Peter Gordon Saunders, Australian social researcher
 Peter Robert Saunders, British sociologist
 Peter Saunders (impresario) (1911–2003), English theatre impresario
 Pete Saunders (born 1960), musician